The marbled swordtail (Xiphophorus meyeri) is a species of freshwater fish in the family Poeciliidae. It was endemic to the Rio Salado system (itself a part of the Rio Grande basin) in Coahuila, northeastern Mexico.

The marbled swordtail is considered extinct in the wild by the IUCN with the last wild record in 1997, meaning that it survives only in captivity. Captive populations are maintained at the Xiphophorus Genetic Stock Center, Texas State University, United States, and by XNP conservation project members, which include public aquariums, universities and private aquarists in several European countries and the United States. The marbled swordtail shares the title as northernmost naturally distributed Xiphophorus with the closely related Monterrey platyfish (X. couchianus) and northern platyfish (X. gordoni). The specific name of this species honours the German ichthyologist Manfred K. Meyer.

References 

Freshwater fish of Mexico
Live-bearing fish
Xiphophorus
Taxa named by Manfred Schartl
Taxa named by Johannes Horst Schröder
Fish described in 1988
Taxonomy articles created by Polbot